"Go In" is a single by American rapper Lil Tjay, released on December 13, 2019 by Columbia Records. It was produced by JD on Tha Track.

Charts

Certifications

References

2019 singles
2019 songs
Lil Tjay songs
Columbia Records singles
Songs written by Lil Tjay